This is the list of cathedrals in Japan sorted by denomination.

Roman Catholic

Cathedrals of the Roman Catholic Church in Japan:
 Cathedral Basilica of St. Francis Xavier (Kawaramachi Church) in Kyoto
 Cathedral of the Blessed Virgin Mary (Tamatsukuri Church) in Osaka
 Cathedral of Christ the King (Niigata Church) in Niigata
 Cathedral of the Immaculate Heart of Mary (Kainan Church) in Naha
 Cathedral of Our Lady of Victory (Daimyomachi Church) in Fukuoka
 Cathedral of Our Lady of the Assumption (Memorial Cathedral of World Peace) (Noboricho Church) in Hiroshima
 Cathedral of the Sacred Heart (Yamate Church) in Yokohama
 Cathedral of St. Mary of the Immaculate Conception (Sekiguchi) in Tokyo
 Cathedral of Sts. Peter and Paul (Nunoike Church) in Nagoya
 Cathedral of St. Theresa of the Child Jesus (Urawa Church) in Urawa
 Immaculate Conception Cathedral (Urakami Church) in Nagasaki
 Kitaichijo Cathedral Church in Sapporo
 Motoderakoji Cathedral Church in Sendai
 Sakuramachi Cathedral Church in Takamatsu
 St. Francis Xavier Cathedral (Oita Church) in Oita
 St. Francis Xavier Cathedral in Kagoshima

Eastern Orthodox
Japanese Orthodox cathedrals:
 Holy Annunciation Cathedral in Kyoto
 Holy Annunciation Cathedral in Sendai
 Holy Resurrection Cathedral in Chiyoda, Tokyo

Anglican
Cathedrals of the Anglican Church in Japan:
 Sapporo Christ Church (The Cathedral Church of Hokkaido) in Sapporo
 Sendai Christian Association (Cathedral) in Sendai
 St. Andrew's Cathedral, Tokyo
 St Andrew's Cathedral in Yokohama
 St. Matthew's Cathedral in Nagoya
 Cathedral Church of St. Agnes in Kyoto
 Kawaguchi Christ Church Cathedral in Osaka
 St. Michael's Cathedral in Kobe
 St. Paul's Cathedral in Fukuoka
 Cathedral of St. Peter and St. Paul in Naha
 St. Matthias' Cathedral in Maebashi

See also

List of cathedrals
Christianity in Japan

References

Cathedrals in Japan
Japan
Cathedrals
Cathedrals